The Saskatoon Theologican Union is an alliance of three Protestant theological colleges at the University of Saskatchewan.

 College of Emmanuel and St. Chad (Anglican Church of Canada)
 Lutheran Theological Seminary, Saskatoon (Evangelical Lutheran Church in Canada)
 St. Andrew's College (United Church of Canada)

There is a Roman Catholic college at the university, St. Thomas More College, which is not a member of the union.

External links
 
 College of Emmanuel and St. Chad
 Lutheran Theological Seminary, Saskatoon
 St. Andrew's College, Saskatoon

Saskatoon Theological Union